is an interchange passenger railway station located in the city of Yamato, Kanagawa, Japan. It is jointly operated by the private railway operators Sagami Railway (Sotetsu) and Odakyu Electric Railway.

Lines
It lies 39.9 kilometers from the Shinjuku terminus.
Odakyu Enoshima Line

Station layout
The station is a joint use station. The north exit is operated by the Sagami Railway and the south exit is operated by the Odakyu Railway, although passengers can use either exit regardless of what line they are using. The Odakyu Railway station consists of two island platforms connected by a footbridge to the station building. The station building is elevated, and located above the platforms and tracks. The Sagami Railway station has one island platform, located underground.

Platforms

Odakyu platforms

Sotetsu platforms

History
Yamato Station opened on May 12, 1926 as a station on the Jintsu Railway. The Odakyu Station was opened on April 1, 1929 slightly to the west of the existing station, and was named . On June 1, 1944, Yamato Station was relocated to become adjacent to Nishi-Yamato Station, with the new joint station taking the name Yamato Station. The station building was completely reconstructed in a multiyear project beginning from 1986. In 1993, the tracks and platform of the Sagami Railway were relocated to a subway level, which created room for expansion of the Odakyu station to two platforms in 1996.

Passenger statistics
In fiscal 2019, the Odakyu station was used by an average of 118,918 passengers daily. During the same period, the Sotetsu portion of the station was used by an average of 115,877 passengers daily.

The passenger figures for previous years are as shown below.

Surrounding area
Yamato Tax Office
Yamato Public Employment Security Office
Kanagawa Prefecture Yamato Health and Welfare Office (Health Center)
Kanagawa Yamato Prefectural Tax Office
Yamato Tokushukai Hospital
Yamato City Mitsuoka Junior High School
Izumi no Mori, a nature park operated by the city of Yamato.

See also
 List of railway stations in Japan

References

External links

Sagami Railway station information 
Odakyu station information 

Railway stations in Kanagawa Prefecture
Railway stations in Japan opened in 1926
Stations of Sagami Railway
Stations of Odakyu Electric Railway
Odakyū Enoshima Line
Railway stations in Yamato, Kanagawa